Monte Venda (lit. Mt. Sell) is the highest mountain in the Euganean Hills of Padua Province, Italy. Monte Venda is located in 4 different municipalities, the summit is divided between Galzignano Terme, Vo', Teolo and Cinto Euganeo

Mountains of Veneto